Kashif Jawad (born February 7, 1981, in Karachi) is a former field hockey player who represented Pakistan in two Olympic Games in 2000 and 2004. A stalwart forward for Pakistan during late 90s and early 2000s Jawad was the team's prime center forward during his career. His career ended abruptly after he was dropped from the team in mid of 2005 due poor physical levels and drop in performance after the death of his father the same year which impacted his game, he was not selected for the team afterwards. He continued playing for Port Qasim in Pakistan National Hockey Championship and played professional leagues in India and Malaysia.

References

 The Dawn

External links

Pakistani male field hockey players
1981 births
Living people
Olympic field hockey players of Pakistan
Field hockey players at the 2000 Summer Olympics
Field hockey players at the 2004 Summer Olympics
2002 Men's Hockey World Cup players
Field hockey players at the 2002 Asian Games
Commonwealth Games medallists in field hockey
Commonwealth Games bronze medallists for Pakistan
Field hockey players at the 2002 Commonwealth Games
Asian Games competitors for Pakistan
21st-century Pakistani people
Medallists at the 2002 Commonwealth Games